Manor is a census town in Palghar district (formerly a part of the Thane district) in the Indian state of Maharashtra. 

It is located 139 kms north of Mumbai on the Mumbai-Ahmedabad National Highway (NH8) and also connects with Nashik via the Manor-Wada Road.

Demographics 
At the 2001 Census of India, Manor had a population of 8,345, consisting of 52% males and 48% females. The literacy rate was 68%, which was higher than the national average of 59.5%. Male literacy was 74%, and female literacy 61%. 14% of the population was under 6 years of age

By the 2011 Census of India, the population grown by  about 25% to more than 10,000. Literacy rates had reached 75%, possibly due to the number of schools and colleges in the town. 6,646 (63.78%) people were identified as Hindu and 3,401 (31.32%) as Muslim.

Residential 
The town is self-sufficient with numerous schools, colleges, hospitals and a bustling marketplace. Since the bifurcation of the Thane district in August 2014, soaring real estate rates in Palghar and Boisar have brought Manor into the limelight as an affordable housing alternative to the working population in the industrial belt. Few of the prominent residential complexes in the vicinity are Khushi Group's Khushi Aangan by Mr Sunil Jain and Riddhi Siddhi Builders by Mr Sudhakar Kamath which are strategically marketed by AweSpace

Schools and Colleges 
Lal Bahadur Shastri High School
Y.N. Chaphekar school
Netaji Subhaschandra Bose English Medium School
Kokan Urdu Education Society Usama Rais Urdu High School
Ali Allana English High School
Nazim Rais Jr. College.

References 
Notes

Sources
 Manor Census 2011

Cities and towns in Palghar district